Chedotlothna Glacier is a glacier in Denali National Park and Preserve in the U.S. state of Alaska. The glacier begins in the Alaska Range between Mount Russell and Mount Dall moving northeast, then north. It is the source of the Swift Fork of the Kuskokwim River. The name Chedotlothna was reported as a native name by S.R. Capps in 1925. Alternate spellings include Chedotlothno and Chedotluthna. The glacier is also called Todzolno' Lughwzra'.

See also
 List of glaciers

References

Glaciers of Denali Borough, Alaska
Glaciers of Denali National Park and Preserve
Glaciers of Alaska